Clemente Promontorio or di Promontorio, was a statesman who became doge of the Republic of Genoa. He was elected on 15 July 1393 to the dogeship after Pietro Fregoso, who had been elected the day before, had stepped down. He himself was deposed the day after his election by Francesco Guistiniano di Garibaldo.

14th-century Doges of Genoa